Sprint is a bus rapid transit scheme under construction in the West Midlands, England. The project is developed by Transport for West Midlands.

Quinton route

In July 2014, it was announced that a new BRT bus-tram service named Sprint would be introduced on the Hagley Road, which would connect with the Metro's Line One extension. Viewed as 'Metro's Little Sister', Sprint is intended to offer a higher level of service quality than standard bus services, and will feature some bus priority measures, like bus lanes and priority signalling to speed up service. Sprint should grow demand, and improve connectivity in areas which do not yet fully justify Metro access. Centro stated that the new City Centre-Quinton route was chosen primarily for its potential for economic growth. The route will have 16 stops.

Cross-city route

Plans remain for the 'Quinton line' but priority was given, following the award of the 2022 Commonwealth Games to Birmingham, for a cross-city route from Walsall along the A34 road, passing by the Alexander Stadium in Perry Barr to Birmingham City Centre and on to Birmingham Airport and Solihull. Work began in April 2021 and aims to be complete before the Commonwealth Games start in July 2022.

Future routes
Future routes are proposed to Stourbridge, Longbridge and Sutton Coldfield and Dudley.

References

Bus routes in the West Midlands (county)
Transport in Birmingham, West Midlands